Infrastructure Development Finance Company Limited, more commonly known as IDFC, is a finance company based in India under the Department of Financial Services, Government of India. It provides finance and advisory services for infrastructure projects, as well as asset management and investment banking.

Company history

IDFC was incorporated on 30 January 1997 by Government of India with its registered office in Chennai and started operations on 9 June 1997.

In August 2005, the company's equity shares were listed at the National Stock Exchange of India (NSE) and Bombay Stock Exchange (BSE) after an initial public offering (IPO).

In May 2008, the company entered into asset management by acquiring the AMC business of Standard Chartered Bank in India, namely Standard Chartered Asset Management Company Pvt Ltd and Standard Chartered Trustee Company Pvt Ltd; the acquired companies were re-branded as IDFC Asset Management Company Pvt Ltd and IDFC AMC Trustee Company Pvt Ltd respectively.

In 2008–09, the company acquired 100% of the share capital of IDFC Capital (Singapore) Pvt Ltd. In the same year, the company established IDFC Foundation to focus on capacity building, policy advisory and sustainability initiatives.

IDFC Bank started operating banking services on 1 October 2015.

References

External links

IDFC Bank

Infrastructure in India
Financial services companies based in Chennai
Companies listed on the Bombay Stock Exchange
IDFC First Bank
1997 establishments in Tamil Nadu
Indian companies established in 1997
Companies listed on the National Stock Exchange of India